Narciso Pascual Colomer, also known as Narciso Pascual y Colomer, (1808 in Madrid – 15 June 1870 in Lisboa) was a Spanish architect. He was one of the most important of the reign of Isabella II, an exponent of the late Neoclassicism and historicist styles. He was a member of the Real Academia de Bellas Artes de San Fernando along with Enrique María Repullés and Ricardo Velázquez Bosco.

The majority of his works were in Madrid, such as the Palacio de las Cortes (1843–1850).
This building is the seat of the Congress of Deputies.

References

Spanish neoclassical architects
1808 births
1870 deaths
People from Madrid
19th-century Spanish architects